Javier Díaz may refer to:

 Javier Díaz (swimmer) (born 1979), retired Mexican swimmer
 Javier Díaz (athlete) (born 1976), Spanish long-distance runner
 Javier Díaz (rugby player) (born 1995), Argentine rugby union player

See also:
 Javi Díaz (born 1997), Spanish footballer